Jiayuguan is a prefecture-level city in northwestern Gansu province, with a population of 312,663 as of the 2020 census. Compared with the 231,853 people in the sixth national census in 2010, there was an increase of 80,810 people, with an average annual increase of 3.04%. Its built-up (or metro) area was home to 768,274 inhabitants made of Jiayuguan City and Suzhou urban district of Jiuquan City now being conurbated.
It is named after the nearby Jiayu Pass, the largest and most intact pass of the Great Wall of China.

Jiayuguan is a major industrial city. It was established in 1958, following the establishment of Jiuquan Steel Company, the largest steel company in Gansu. Mining and mineral processing are the primary industries of the city. By area, it is by far the smallest prefecture-level division of Gansu.

The fortress at Jiayuguan is situated at the end of the portion of the Great Wall of China which was built by the Ming Dynasty, in the 14th century.

Administration

As 2019, Jiayuguan City is underdivided to 3 districts and 3 towns.
Districts
 Xiongguan District
 Jingtie District
 Changcheng District

Towns
 Xincheng()
 Yuquan()
 Wenshu()

Jiayuguan is divided into 2 subdistricts and 3 towns.

Formerly, Jiayuguan had 3 management districts and further divided into 3 towns with a total population of 231,853 (2010).

Transport 
Jiayuguan is served by China National Highway 312, and the Lanzhou-Xinjiang and Jiayuguan-Ceke Railways. A 69-km-long branch railway, the Jiajing Railway, runs from Jiayuguan to Jingtieshan.

Jiayuguan is served by the Jiayuguan Airport that offers direct air services to Xi'an on Shanghai Airlines and Beijing on Air China.

Climate 
Jiayuguan has a cool arid climate (Köppen BWk), in common with most of northwestern China. Summers feature pleasant mornings and very warm afternoons, whilst winters are freezing to frigid though with essentially no snow due to the extreme aridity produced by the Siberian High.

References

External links

Official website, City of Jiayuguan

 
Prefecture-level divisions of Gansu
Cities in Gansu